Mervyn Edward Wingfield, 7th Viscount Powerscourt  (13 October 1836 – 5 June 1904) was an Irish peer. He became Viscount Powerscourt in 1844 on the death of his father Richard Wingfield, 6th Viscount Powerscourt. Through this Wingfield line he was a maternal descendant of the Noble House of Stratford. His mother was Lady Elizabeth Frances Charlotte, daughter of Robert Jocelyn, 3rd Earl of Roden.

On 26 April 1864, Wingfield married Lady Julia Coke, the daughter of Thomas Coke, 2nd Earl of Leicester. They had five children:
 Mervyn Wingfield, 8th Viscount Powerscourt (1880–1947), a great-grandfather of Sarah, Duchess of York
 Maj.-Gen. Hon. Maurice Anthony Wingfield (21 June 1883 – 14 April 1956), married Sybil Frances Leyland and had issue. He was Lees Knowles Lecturer in 1924
 Hon. Olive Elizabeth Wingfield (6 November 1884 – May 1978), married Maj. William John Bates van de Weyer and had issue
 Hon. Clare Meriel Wingfield (5 June 1886 – 1969), married Arthur Chichester, 4th Baron Templemore
 Hon. Lilah Katherine Julia Wingfield (13 January 1888 – 1981), married Sir Clive Morrison-Bell, 1st Baronet

Powerscourt was appointed a Knight of the Order of St Patrick on 2 August 1871. He was created Baron Powerscourt  in the Peerage of the United Kingdom in 1885, enabling him to sit in the House of Lords.

Art collection
Lord Powerscourt collected paintings as a hobby and published a catalog in 1903 called A description and history of Powerscourt. He sometimes included details about his purchases in his list.

References

External links

Mervyn
1836 births
1904 deaths
Irish representative peers
Knights of St Patrick
Members of the Privy Council of Ireland
Viscounts in the Peerage of Ireland
Peers of the United Kingdom created by Queen Victoria